Area code 251 is a telephone area code in the North American Numbering Plan (NANP) for southwestern Alabama, serving Mobile, Baldwin, and Washington counties and parts of six other counties.  It was created on June 18, 2001, as a split from area code 334.  In order to allow people time to reprogram electronics such as computers, cell phones, pagers and fax machines, use of the 334 area code continued in the 251 areas through January 7, 2002.

Prior to October 2021, area code 251 had telephone numbers assigned for the central office code 988. In 2020, 988 was designated nationwide as a dialing code for the National Suicide Prevention Lifeline, which created a conflict for exchanges that permit seven-digit dialing. This area code was therefore scheduled to transition to ten-digit dialing by October 24, 2021.

Service area
The numbering plan area comprises the following cities.

Atmore
Bay Minette
Bayou la Batre
Bon Secour
Brewton
Chatom
Chickasaw
Citronelle
Creola
Daphne
Dauphin Island
East Brewton
Evergreen
Fairhope
Flomaton
Foley
Fort Morgan
Grand Bay
Grove Hill
Gulf Shores
Jackson
Loxley
Mobile
Monroeville
Orange Beach
Prichard
Robertsdale
Saraland
Satsuma
Semmes
Silas
Silverhill
Spanish Fort
Stapleton
Stockton
Summerdale
Theodore
Tillman's Corner

See also
List of Alabama area codes
List of NANP area codes
North American Numbering Plan

References

External links
Area Code Changes - 251

List of exchanges from CIDLookup.com, 251 Area Code

Telecommunications-related introductions in 2001
251
251